Nina Sterckx (born 26 July 2002) is a Belgian weightlifter. She is a two-time bronze medalist at the European Weightlifting Championships and achieved 5th place representing Belgium at the 2020 Summer Olympics in Tokyo, Japan.

In 2019, she won the gold medal in the women's junior 49kg event at the European Junior & U23 Weightlifting Championships in Bucharest, Romania. She also won the gold medal in the women's 55kg event at the 2022 Junior World Weightlifting Championships held in Heraklion, Greece.

Career 

She won the silver medal in the under-15 girls 48kg event at the 2017 European Youth Weightlifting Championships held in Pristina, Kosovo. She won the bronze medal in the under-17 girls 53kg event at the 2018 European Youth Weightlifting Championships held in San Donato Milanese, Italy.

Both in 2018 and 2019, she competed in the women's 55kg event at the World Weightlifting Championships. In 2018, she also competed in the women's 53kg event at the European Weightlifting Championships held in  Bucharest, Romania. In 2019, she finished in 8th place at the European Weightlifting Championships held in Batumi, Georgia.

In April 2021, she won the bronze medal in the women's 55kg event at the European Weightlifting Championships held in Moscow, Russia. In May 2021, she won the silver medal in her event at the Junior World Weightlifting Championships held in Tashkent, Uzbekistan.

She won the silver medal in the women's 55kg event at the 2021 Junior World Weightlifting Championships held in Tashkent, Uzbekistan. In July 2021, she represented Belgium at the 2020 Summer Olympics in Tokyo, Japan. Her goal was to compete at the 2024 Summer Olympics in Paris, France but her result at the Junior World Weightlifting Championships, limits on the number of athletes per NOC and doping violations of other countries meant that she ranked 8th in the 49 kg weight class, allowing her to qualify for the 2020 Summer Olympics. She finished in 5th place in the women's 49kg event. She lifted 81 kg in the Snatch, 99 kg in the Clean & Jerk and she set a new Belgian record of 180 kg in total.

She won the gold medal in the women's 55kg event at the 2022 Junior World Weightlifting Championships held in Heraklion, Greece. It was the first time a weightlifter representing Belgium became junior world champion. She won the bronze medal in her event at the 2022 European Weightlifting Championships held in Tirana, Albania. She also won the bronze medals in the Snatch and Clean & Jerk events with lifts of 94 kg and 111 kg respectively.

She won the gold medal in her event at the 2022 European Junior & U23 Weightlifting Championships held in Durrës, Albania. She also set new junior world records in the Clean & Jerk (118kg) and in total (213kg). In preparation for the 2024 Summer Olympics, which only features the women's 49kg and 59kg weight classes, she decided to move down from the 55kg to the 49kg weight class. She finished in 6th place in the women's 49kg event at the 2022 World Weightlifting Championships held in Bogotá, Colombia.

Achievements

References

External links 
 

Living people
2002 births
Place of birth missing (living people)
Belgian female weightlifters
European Weightlifting Championships medalists
Olympic weightlifters of Belgium
Weightlifters at the 2020 Summer Olympics
21st-century Belgian women